Structure and Dynamics: eJournal of Anthropological and Related Sciences is an open access, free, peer reviewed journal edited by Douglas R. White at the Institute for Mathematical Behavioral Sciences  at the University of California, Irvine. The journal is part of the University of California eScholarship collection.

Structure and dynamics is the name of a subfield in the social sciences, used particularly in social anthropology and sociology, which connotes that while structure is an important concept in social theory, contemporary social theory has long since moved beyond structural functionalism, which was identified with Radcliffe-Brown and Talcott Parsons. It is also an important subfield in the complexity sciences.

See also 
List of social science journals#Anthropology

External links 

Structure and Dynamics eJournal
Structure and Dynamics contents
eScholarship repository
DOAJ index

Open access journals
Sociology journals
Anthropology journals
Publications established in 2006
Social anthropology